HHG Corporation,  doing business as Extreme Championship Wrestling (ECW), was a professional wrestling promotion and media company that was based in Philadelphia, Pennsylvania. The promotion was founded in 1992 by Tod Gordon as National Wrestling Alliance (NWA) affiliate Eastern Championship Wrestling.  The following year, businessman and wrestling promoter Paul Heyman took over the creative end of the promotion from Eddie Gilbert and rechristened the promotion as Extreme Championship Wrestling.

The promotion was known for highlighting a "hardcore wrestling" style, with matches regularly featuring weapons (including the frequent use of tables and fire) and revolving around adult-themed storylines.  Though the hardcore style was the main focus, ECW also showcased various international styles of professional wrestling not usually seen in the U.S., ranging from Mexican lucha libre to Japanese puroresu. 

Heyman's creative direction created new stars, and established ECW as the third major national wrestling promotion in the United States in the second half of the 1990s, competing with the World Wrestling Federation (WWF, now WWE) and World Championship Wrestling (WCW). ECW folded in 2001 when it was unable to secure a new national television contract, and World Wrestling Entertainment, Inc. purchased the assets of the company from bankruptcy in January 2003.

Following the success of the One Night Stand tribute show in 2005, WWE relaunched the ECW franchise as a third brand in 2006 alongside their existing Raw and SmackDown brands. It debuted on June 13, 2006, on Sci Fi in the United States and ran for close to four years until it aired its final episode on February 16, 2010, on the rebranded Syfy.

History

Tri-State Wrestling Alliance and NWA Eastern Championship Wrestling (1989–1994)

ECW had its origins in 1990 under the banner Tri-State Wrestling Alliance owned by Joel Goodhart. ECW would, in fact, continue to use the former Tri-State Heavyweight championship belt to represent its own Championship, although the ECW title was not considered a continuation of that title. In 1992, Goodhart sold his share of the company to his partner, Tod Gordon, who renamed the promotion Eastern Championship Wrestling. When Eastern Championship Wrestling was founded, it was not a member of the National Wrestling Alliance (NWA). At the time, "Hot Stuff" Eddie Gilbert, the lead booker of Eastern Championship Wrestling, had managed to secure television time on SportsChannel Philadelphia starting in April 1993. Gilbert, after a falling out with Tod Gordon, was replaced in September 1993 by  then-28 year old businessman Paul Heyman. Heyman, known on television as Paul E. Dangerously, had just been fired by World Championship Wrestling (WCW) and was looking for a new challenge.

Secession from the NWA (1994)

In 1994, Jim Crockett's non-compete agreement with Ted Turner, who purchased World Championship Wrestling (WCW) from Crockett in November 1988, was up and he decided to start promoting with the NWA again. Crockett went to Tod Gordon and asked him to hold a tournament for the NWA's top prize, the NWA World Heavyweight Championship, in ECW's home area of Philadelphia, Pennsylvania on August 27, 1994. NWA President Dennis Coralluzzo alleged that Crockett and Gordon were going to try to monopolize the title (akin to Crockett's actions in the 1980s) and stated Crockett did not have the NWA board's approval, which resulted in Coralluzzo personally overseeing the tournament. Gordon took offense at Coralluzzo for his power plays and began contemplating a plan to secede ECW from the NWA through a controversial and public manner that would attract attention to ECW and insult the NWA organization. Gordon planned to have Shane Douglas, who was scheduled to face 2 Cold Scorpio in the tournament finals on August 30, 1994, throw down the NWA World Heavyweight Championship belt upon winning as an act of defiance.

Tod Gordon and Paul Heyman originally planned the idea of throwing down the NWA World Heavyweight Championship belt. Heyman persuaded Douglas by noting that the negative would only be that NWA traditionalists would just see them as traitors to tradition. Adding to Douglas' decision was the animosity between Douglas and NWA President Dennis Coralluzzo, who at the time publicly criticized Douglas and told NWA affiliated bookers not to book Douglas for shows. Coralluzzo believed that Douglas was a "bad risk" and had the tendency to no-show events. Douglas ultimately decided to go through with Gordon and Heyman's plan, inspired by his father's motto of "doing right by the people that do right by you." After looking up and saying, "This is it tonight, Dad," Douglas threw down the NWA World Heavyweight Championship belt, stating that he did not want to be champion of a "dead promotion" that "died seven years ago." He then raised the Eastern Championship Wrestling title belt and declared it to be a World Heavyweight Championship – calling it the only real world title left in professional wrestling. When recalling this event years later, Paul Heyman stated the following in a 1998 chat:

Coralluzzo was interviewed after the event and declared that Douglas would be the world champion of the NWA "whether he likes it or not", calling Douglas' actions a "disgrace" and said he would move to have Douglas stripped of both the NWA World Heavyweight Championship and the Eastern Championship Wrestling Heavyweight Championship, calling him "undeserving" of both titles. Gordon made the following announcement on the next edition of NWA-ECW programming:

The promotion showcased many different styles of professional wrestling, including hardcore wrestling matches as well as lucha libre and Japanese wrestling styles.

ECW Arena and television syndication (1994–2001)

The bulk of ECW's shows remained at the ECW Arena, a former warehouse secluded under a section of Interstate 95. Seating comprised simple folding chairs and four sets of portable bleachers, with the unconventional scene reflective of the gritty style of the promotion itself. Shows were broadcast on a Philadelphia local cable sports station (SportsChannel America's local affiliate, SportsChannel Philadelphia) on Tuesday evenings. After Sports Channel Philadelphia went off the air in 1997, the show moved to WPPX-TV 61. It later moved to a former independent broadcast station (WGTW 48) in Philadelphia on either Friday or Saturday night, and at 1:00a.m. or at 2:00a.m. Shows were also aired on the MSG Network in NYC on Friday nights (early Saturday morning) at 2:00a.m. Due to the obscurity of the stations and ECW itself, as well as the lack of FCC oversight at that late hour, many times expletives and violence were not edited out of these showings, along with extensive use of copyrighted music and music videos.

Paul Heyman and cross promotion with the WWF and the USWA (1996–1997)

In 1995, Tod Gordon sold Extreme Championship Wrestling, Inc., to his head booker, Paul Heyman, trading as HHG Corporation. Afterward, Gordon remained in ECW as a figurehead commissioner. Years after being the ECW "Commissioner", Gordon left ECW in May 1997, his absence was explained on-air that he retired from wrestling due to family. Rumors circulated, however, that Gordon was fired by Heyman after he was suspected as a "locker room mole" for a rival wrestling promotion, helping to lure talent to World Championship Wrestling.

Storyline-wise, Vince McMahon first became "aware" of ECW while at the 1995 King of the Ring event in ECW's home base of Philadelphia. During the match between Mabel and Savio Vega, the crowd suddenly started to chant, "ECW! ECW! ECW!". On September 22, 1996, at the In Your House: Mind Games event in Philadelphia, ECW stars The Sandman, Tommy Dreamer, Paul Heyman, and Taz were in the front row with Sandman even interfering in one match (when he threw beer on Savio Vega during his strap match with Bradshaw). McMahon acknowledged ECW's status as a local, up-and-coming promotion on the air. The following night on WWF Monday Night RAW, broadcast on September 23, 1996, at the onset of a match between The Bodydonnas vs. The British Bulldog and Owen Hart, Bill Alfonso, and Tazz could be seen invading the program. Both Tazz and Alfonso were able to successfully jump the security rails, and Tazz was able to prominently display a bright orange sign with black lettering that read "Sabu Fears Tazz-ECW". On February 24, 1997, ECW "invaded" Raw from the Manhattan Center. They advanced a storyline, plugged their first ever pay-per-view and worked three matches in front of the WWF audience while McMahon called the action with both Jerry "The King" Lawler and Paul Heyman. The Manhattan Center in New York was peppered with a large number of ECW fans, who gave the WWF wrestlers "Boring!" chants when they felt it was warranted. Likewise, when the ECW performers arrived, they popped and introduced the WWF Monday night audience to some trademark ECW group chants. This invasion sparked an inter-promotional feud between ECW and Lawler's United States Wrestling Association. Lawler disparaged ECW on-camera and convinced wrestlers such as Rob Van Dam and Sabu to join him in an anti-ECW crusade. Throughout 1997, ECW wrestlers appeared on USWA television programs, and vice versa. As part of the working relationship between ECW and the WWF, a number of WWF-contracted wrestlers were sent to ECW for seasoning in 1997, including Droz and Brakkus.

On April 13, 1997, ECW broadcast their first pay-per-view (PPV) wrestling card Barely Legal, highlighted by Terry Funk defeating Raven to win the ECW World Heavyweight Championship. In June 1997, the company's Wrestlepalooza '97 event featured Raven's final ECW match before leaving for WCW. In this match, Tommy Dreamer finally beat Raven, his longtime nemesis. Dreamer's celebration was short-lived, though, as Jerry Lawler, along with Sabu and Rob Van Dam showed up to attack Dreamer. This set up a match between Dreamer and Lawler at the pay-per-view, 1997 Hardcore Heaven, on August 17, which was won by Dreamer. ECW continued through 1998 and early 1999 with a string of successful pay-per-views.

Mike Awesome controversy and promotional rivalry (2000)

In April 2000, Mike Awesome made a surprise appearance on WCW Monday Nitro—making his debut by attacking Kevin Nash—while still reigning as ECW World Heavyweight Champion. Mike Awesome's friend Lance Storm has said that Awesome refused to sign a new contract with ECW until Paul Heyman paid him overdue wages. There were rumors that WCW Executive Vice-President Eric Bischoff wanted Awesome to drop the ECW World Championship belt in the trash can on television, as had been done previously with the WWF Women's title by Madusa when she jumped from the WWF to WCW. After Paul Heyman filed an injunction, WCW refrained from having Awesome appear on Nitro with the belt, but did acknowledge him as the champion. Eventually, a compromise was reached. Awesome (a WCW employee and the reigning ECW World Heavyweight champion) appeared at an April 13, 2000, ECW event in Indianapolis, Indiana, where he lost the title to Tazz (who was working for the World Wrestling Federation).

In July 2000, ECW made its West Coast debut, holding its annual summer pay-per-view ECW Heat Wave in Los Angeles. At the time Los Angeles was home to Xtreme Pro Wrestling (XPW), and its owner Rob Black purchased six front row tickets for the show. The tickets were given to a cadre of XPW talent, and their mission was to make it clear that ECW was on enemy turf; it was not part of either companies' storylines. At the beginning of the main event, the XPW contingent donned shirts emblazoned with the XPW logo, gaining the attention of security and ECW wrestler Tommy Dreamer. Security ejected the XPW group from the building and later, a brawl broke out in the parking lot between members of the XPW ring crew and the ECW locker room. The XPW wrestlers were not involved in the fracas, during which the ECW wrestlers brutalized the XPW ring crew with several of the ring crew members left in pools of their own blood. Initial reports claimed that XPW valet Kristi Myst had somehow touched ECW valet Francine Fournier and that this is what prompted the incident, but Fournier herself has since gone on record as saying that she was never grabbed or in any other way touched by any of the XPW crew, and other eyewitnesses support the story that Fournier never had a hand laid on her. XPW was not acknowledged by ECW announcer Joey Styles during the pay-per-view telecast, however at the November to Remember pay-per-view a few months later, color-commentator Don Callis made a subtle reference to the incident, describing a wild brawl as "looking like a Los Angeles parking lot." The XPW contingent at ringside consisted of wrestlers The Messiah, Kid Kaos, Supreme, Kristi Myst, Homeless Jimmy and XPW announcer Kris Kloss.

ECW on TNN and collapse (1999–2001)
In August 1999, ECW began to broadcast nationally on TNN (for what was initially a three-year contract) as ECW on TNN. Despite very limited advertising, low budget, and disputes with the broadcaster (reflected on The Network stable), ECW became TNN's highest rated show and bolstered the network's Friday night slot, both in ratings and line-up. However, financial problems began rocking the company; by October 2000, ECW on TNN was cancelled (with the final episode airing on October 6, 2000) in favor of WWF Raw is War moving to the network. Paul Heyman stated he believed that the inability to land another national television deal was the cause of ECW's demise.

ECW struggled for months after the cancellation, trying to secure a new national television deal. On December 30, 2000, ECW Hardcore TV aired for the last time and the January 7, 2001, broadcast of Guilty as Charged was the company's last PPV. The promotion's January 13, 2001, show in Pine Bluff, Arkansas would prove to be its final event of any kind. Living Dangerously was scheduled to air on March 11, 2001, but because of financial trouble it was canceled in February. Heyman could not get out of financial trouble and ECW closed on April 4, 2001. Heyman, who became color commentator for Raw that February (replacing Jerry Lawler, who quit WWF in protest after his then-wife, Stacy Carter, had been fired by McMahon), had supposedly never told his wrestlers that the company was on its last legs and was unable to pay them for a while. Heyman also noted in later years that he had made an effort to put ECW on the USA Network (then the former home of Raw) unsuccessfully, despite McMahon having sent an email encouraging USA Network executive Steven Chau to add ECW to their programming. 

The company was listed as having assets totaling $1,385,500. Included in that number was $860,000 in accounts receivable owed the company by In Demand Network (PPV), Acclaim (video games) and Original San Francisco Toy Company (action figures). The balance of the assets were the video tape library ($500,000), a 1998 Ford truck ($19,500) and the remaining inventory of merchandise ($4). The liabilities of the company totaled $8,881,435.17. Wrestlers and talent were listed, with amounts owed ranging from $2 for Sabu and Steve Corino to hundreds, and in some cases, thousands of dollars. The highest amounts owed to talents were Rob Van Dam ($150,000), Shane Douglas ($145,000), Tommy Dreamer ($100,000), Joey Styles ($50,480), Rhyno ($50,000), and Francine Fournier ($47,275). On January 28, 2003, World Wrestling Entertainment Inc. purchased ECW's assets from HHG Corporation in court, acquiring the rights to ECW's video library.

Legacy and return

In ECW, there were virtually no rules. The role of referees only included counting pinfalls, acknowledging submissions, and upholding rope breaks. ECW was known for making popular several types of matches, including the 3-Way Dance, barbed wire match, tables match and Singapore Cane match among others. According to Heyman, ECW was the first victim of the "Monday Night Wars" between WCW Monday Nitro and Monday Night Raw. The WWF had a working relationship with ECW, going so far as to participate in cross-promotional angles, providing talent on loan in exchange for developed young talent and marketable gimmicks (Al Snow's "head" gimmick among them) and even providing financial aid to Heyman for a considerable period of time. WCW and ECW (particularly Heyman and the WCW executives) however had a very poor relationship, and WCW refused to even mention ECW by name (with a few notable exceptions; including a passing remark by Raven in late 1997 and Nash and Scott Hall mentioning it as a viable second option in American wrestling in a slight on their main competition, the World Wrestling Federation). It was referred to as "barbed wire city" and "a major independent promotion that wrestled in bingo halls" during a segment directed at Diamond Dallas Page. Despite this, ECW was subject to frequent talent raids from both companies, losing many of their top talent in the process, and being a big reason for the company’s eventual closure. The former ECW Arena, now known as the 2300 Arena, is host to the Hardcore Hall of Fame, which recognizes its history with hardcore wrestling.

The Alliance

A few months after the promotion's 2001 demise, ECW resurfaced as a stable as part of the World Wrestling Federation Invasion storyline. On the July 9, 2001, edition of Raw, Heyman, who had been hired by the WWF as Raw color commentator while ECW was still in bankruptcy proceedings, joined several former ECW alumni on the WWF roster (including the debuting Rob Van Dam and Tommy Dreamer) and claimed that he was bringing ECW back to participate in the Invasion by themselves (at the time, however, the ownership of ECW, including the use of its name on-air, was disputed despite Heyman still technically owning the company when he jumped ship to the WWF. In addition, WWF faced legal action by Harry Slash & The Slashtones for the use of the song "This Is Extreme!" which was eventually settled). Before Raw was over that evening, Heyman and Shane McMahon, who had (kayfabe) purchased World Championship Wrestling (WCW), revealed that they were in cahoots with each other and that Heyman had (also kayfabe) sold ECW to Stephanie McMahon, forming The Alliance to try and wrestle power from Vince McMahon. At that time, the original inter-promotional feud devolved into another internal power struggle among the McMahon family. The defection of WWF superstars to The Alliance continued the shift as less focus was placed on WCW and ECW performers – in fact, with rare exceptions such as Van Dam, the ECW alumni in The Alliance were given even less focus than WCW's performers, with WCW's logo even representing the entire stable. The feud lasted six months and concluded with WWF defeating The Alliance at the 2001 Survivor Series when Kurt Angle attacked Stone Cold Steve Austin, allowing The Rock, who had himself gotten attacked by Chris Jericho during the match (trying to help The Alliance in the process), to get the winning pinfall. The WWF's victory also marked the end of the Invasion storyline and WCW and ECW wrestlers were reintegrated into the WWF.

Documentaries
On January 28, 2003, World Wrestling Entertainment Inc. purchased ECW's assets from HHG Corporation in court, acquiring the rights to ECW's video library. They used this video library to put together a two-disc DVD titled The Rise and Fall of ECW. The set was released in November 2004. The main feature of the DVD was a near three-hour documentary on the company's history, with the other disc featuring 7 matches from the promotion. An unauthorized DVD called Forever Hardcore was written, directed and produced by former WCW crew member Jeremy Borash in response to The Rise and Fall of ECW. The DVD had stories of wrestlers who were not employed by WWE telling their side of ECW's history.  During the week of November 10, 2014, WWE had ECW Week on the WWE Network featuring the ECW Exposed special hosted by Joey Styles and Paul Heyman.

Reunions and relaunch

WWE

By 2005, WWE began reintroducing ECW through content from the ECW video library and a series of books, which included the release of The Rise and Fall of ECW documentary. With heightened and rejuvenated interest in the ECW franchise, WWE organized ECW One Night Stand on June 12, a reunion event that featured ECW alumni. Shane McMahon had the idea of an online, low budget show, but they asked television stations and PPV producers and they were interested in ECW. 

Due to the financial and critical success of the production, WWE produced the second ECW One Night Stand on June 11, 2006, which served as the premiere event in the relaunch of the ECW franchise as a WWE brand, complementary to Raw and SmackDown. On June 13, Heyman, the brand's former owner and newly appointed figurehead for the ECW brand, recommissioned the ECW World Heavyweight Championship to be the brand's world title and awarded it to Rob Van Dam as a result of winning the WWE Championship at ECW One Night Stand 2006. The brand would continue to operate until February 16, 2010, where it became defunct and replaced with NXT. Under the WWE banner, ECW was presented following the same format of the other brands, with match rules, such as count outs and disqualifications, being standard. Matches featuring the rule set of the ECW promotion were classified as being contested under "Extreme Rules" and were only fought when specified.

In 2022, the WWE revived the Heat Wave event as its television special for NXT.

Other reunions
On the same weekend as the ECW One Night Stand 2005 event another reunion show was held at the ECW Arena. Booked and promoted by Shane Douglas, Cody Michaels and Jeremy Borash, Hardcore Homecoming was held on June 10, 2005.  Because of the success of the initial event a tour was planned, and later the DVD documentary Forever Hardcore was released by the same production crew as a counterpart to WWE's Rise and Fall of ECW.

Following Tommy Dreamer's debut in Total Nonstop Action Wrestling, a new stable was formed called EV2.0 consisting of former ECW alumni. TNA President Dixie Carter agreed to give the stable their own reunion show at TNA's annual Hard Justice pay-per-view. Billed as the last ECW reunion show, Hardcore Justice aired on August 8, 2010. EV2.0 remained on the active roster for the remainder of the year. The Extreme Rising promotion featured many ECW alumni as well as younger talent and embraced the hardcore style of the original ECW. Their first show, Extreme Reunion, took place on April 28, 2012. It was result of the team of Douglas, Michaels, Kevin Kleinrock and Steve and Michael O'Neil. In 2012, Dreamer founded House of Hardcore, a wrestling promotion named after the ECW wrestling school and inspired by the hardcore style of wrestling. Since then, HOH has held numerous wrestling events mainly in areas where ECW was held such as the ECW Arena.

Other effects
Following the closure of ECW, a handful of new professional wrestling promotions would launch or expand to fill in the void that features former talent associated with ECW. The Ring of Honor promotion would launch in 2002 after RF Video's owner, Rob Feinstein, convinced to fill the ECW void by starting his own pro wrestling promotion, and distributing its made-for-DVD/VHS productions exclusively through RF Video. After several ownership changes over the years, ROH is currently owned by Tony Khan, the owner of All Elite Wrestling since 2022. Other hardcore wrestling promotions such as Combat Zone Wrestling and Xtreme Pro Wrestling would then follow suit onwards in the years ahead.

Championships and programming

Championships

Programming

See also

List of former Extreme Championship Wrestling personnel
List of ECW supercards and pay-per-view events

References

Further reading
 Hardcore History: The Extremely Unauthorized Story of ECW – Scott Williams
 The Rise and Fall of ECW – Thom Loverro for World Wrestling Entertainment
 Turning the Tables – John Lister
 Sex, Drugs, and Wrestling – The Truth, The Lies, and the Extreme – a Rob Van Dam story – Tod Gordon

External links

 Official website
 Official Website of World Wrestling Entertainment (WWE)'s Extreme Championship Wrestling (ECW)
 Hardcore Memories – ECW Nostalgia and History
 Wrestling-Titles.com: ECW
 Solie.org – ECW Title Histories
  The Wrestling Follower – Eastern Championship Wrestling Results Archive
 100th Episode in ECW-WWE era and The Mass Transit Incident (Spanish)
 ECW Information at Pro-Wrestling Edge

 
1992 establishments in Pennsylvania
2001 disestablishments in Pennsylvania
American independent professional wrestling promotions based in Pennsylvania
Entertainment companies established in 1992
Entertainment companies disestablished in 2007
Companies that filed for Chapter 11 bankruptcy in 2001
Defunct brands
Defunct companies
National Wrestling Alliance members
Professional wrestling in Philadelphia
WWE